František Drtikol (3 March 1883 – 13 January 1961) was a Czech photographer known for his nudes and portraits.

Life and work 

Drtikol was born in Příbram into a merchant family, the younger of three children, brother of sisters, Ema and Maria. He was married twice: in 1921–1926 to Ervín Kupferova, with whom he had a daughter, and then in 1942–1959 (until her death) to Jarmila Rambouskova

As a young man he wanted to be a painter, but his father directed him to train for a less precarious career as a photographer. In 1901, aged 18 and after an apprenticeship, he enrolled in the Teaching and Research Institute of Photography in Munich, a city which was major centre of Symbolism and Art Nouveau and which was influential on his career. From 1907 to 1910 he had his own studio in Příbram, but had little success. In 1910 he relocated to Prague, where he established a portrait studio on the fourth floor of a Baroque corner house at 9 Vodičkova, now demolished. In Prague he made many portraits of notable cultural figures.

In the 1920s and 1930s, Drtikol received significant awards at international photo salons. He was a contributor to the illustrated weekly Pestrý týden. Jaroslav Rössler, an important avant-garde photographer, was one of his pupils.

Drtikoll's portraits and nudes show development from pictorialism and symbolism to modern compositions in which the nude body is juxtaposed with large geometric structures and thrown shadows. These are reminiscent of Cubism, and at the same time his nudes suggest the kind of movement that was characteristic of the Futurist aesthetic.

He began using plywood figures in a period he called "photopurism". The resulting images resembled silhouettes of the human form. In the final stage of his photographic work Drtikol created compositions of little carved figures, with elongated shapes, symbolically expressing various themes from Buddhism. In 1935 he gave up photography and concentrated on painting, Buddhist religious and philosophical systems.

Drtikol died in Prague on 13 January 1961. A collection of some 20,000 of his prints is in the Museum of Decorative Arts in Prague.

Publications 
Z dvorků a dvorečků staré Prahy (From the courtyards and yards of old Prague; 1911)
Le nus de Drtikol (1929)
Žena ve světle (Woman in the Light; Prague, 1938)

Bibliography 
Anna Fárová: "František Drtikol. Photograph des Art Deco", 1986.
Vladimír Birgus: "Drtikol. Modernist Nudes", Robert Koch Gallery, San Francisco 1997.
Vladimír Birgus and Jan Mlčoch: "Akt in Czech Photography", 2001.
Alessandro Bertolotti: "Books of nudes", 2007.
Stanislav Doleža, Anna Fárová, Petr Nedoma: František Drtikol – fotograf, malíř, mystik. Galerie Rudolfinum, Praha 1998
Karel Funk:  Mystik a učitel František Drtikol - Pokyny pro duchovní cestu, Fontána 2001 
Jan Mlčoch: František Drtikol – Fotografie 1901–1914. KANT, Praha 1999

References

External links
 Teachings of František Drtikol
 The57Persones of Central Bohemia Region - FRANTISEK DRTIKOL
 Radio Prague
 SK Josefsberg Studio - František Drtikol
 František Drtikol on photography.about.com
 Fototorst: František Drtikol
 Art of the photogravure 
 Fostinum: František Drtikol
 

1883 births
1961 deaths
Czech photographers
Czech erotic photographers
People from Příbram
Portrait photographers
Czech Buddhists